Brynjolfsson is an Icelandic patronymic surname, literally meaning "son of Brynjolf". Notable people with the name include:

 Ari Brynjolfsson (1927–2013), Icelandic–born American physicist
 Erik Brynjolfsson (born 1962), American academic

Icelandic-language surnames